Lacanau is a commune in the Gironde department, Nouvelle-Aquitaine, southwestern France. Lacanau is a surfing area.

Lacanau is a member of the Community of Municipalities Médoc's Lakes which includes the municipalities of Lacanau, Carcans and Hourtin, the territory Médoc Océan.

History
The United States Navy established a naval air station at NAS 001 Le Moutchic on 31 August 1917 to operate seaplanes during World War I. The base closed shortly after the First Armistice at Compiègne.

Population

See also
Communes of the Gironde department

References

External links

 Official website of the tourist office Médoc Océan
 Official Youtube of the tourist office Médoc Océan
 Official Flicker of the tourist office Médoc Océan
  Lacanauocean.com 

Communes of Gironde